Swamp Angel is an unincorporated community in Pottawatomie County, Kansas, United States.  It is located approximately halfway between Manhattan and St. George.

History
It was likely named after the Swamp Angel, a large Parrott rifle used in the American Civil War.

Education
The community is served by Manhattan–Ogden USD 383 public school district.

References

Further reading

External links
 Pottawatomie County maps: Current, Historic, KDOT

Unincorporated communities in Pottawatomie County, Kansas
Unincorporated communities in Kansas